Taito Haara (born 14 September 1942) is a Finnish weightlifter. He competed at the 1972 Summer Olympics and the 1976 Summer Olympics.

References

External links
 

1942 births
Living people
Finnish male weightlifters
Olympic weightlifters of Finland
Weightlifters at the 1972 Summer Olympics
Weightlifters at the 1976 Summer Olympics
People from Orimattila
Sportspeople from Päijät-Häme